Lindowan Reservoir is of the impounding variety, located 1 kilometre north of Kilcreggan. It used to be the main source of water for a nearby threshing mill. The earthfill dam is 3 metres high, and was constructed before 1850.

See also
 List of reservoirs and dams in the United Kingdom

References

Sources
"Argyll and Bute Council Reservoirs Act 1975 Public Register"

Reservoirs in Argyll and Bute